Summer's End may refer to:

Film 
 Summer's End (film), a 1999 Canadian-American TV film

Music 
 "Summer's End", a 1999 song by Amorphis from the album Tuonela
 "Summer's End", a 2014 song by DragonForce from the album Maximum Overload
 "Summer's End", a 2007 song by the Foo Fighters from the album Echoes, Silence, Patience & Grace
 "Summer's End", a 2018 song by John Prine from the album The Tree of Forgiveness
 Summer's End, a 2004 album by Autumn